Shazhuyu Township (Mandarin: 沙珠玉乡) is a township in Gonghe County, Hainan Tibetan Autonomous Prefecture, Qinghai, China. In 2010, Shazhuyu Township had a total population of 5,153: 2,638 males and 2,515 females: 1,057 aged under 14, 3,789 aged between 15 and 65 and 307 aged over 65.

Climate 

Shazhuyu has a subarctic climate (Köppen climate classification Dwc).

References 

Township-level divisions of Qinghai
Hainan Tibetan Autonomous Prefecture